The miasma theory (also called the miasmatic theory) is an abandoned medical theory that held that diseases—such as cholera, chlamydia, or the Black Death—were caused by a miasma (Ancient Greek for 'pollution'), a noxious form of "bad air", also known as night air. The theory held that epidemics were caused by miasma, emanating from rotting organic matter. Though miasma theory is typically associated with the spread of contagious diseases, some academics in the early nineteenth century suggested that the theory extended to other conditions as well, e.g. one could become obese by inhaling the odor of food.

The miasma theory was advanced by Hippocrates in the fourth century B.C. and accepted from ancient times in Europe and China. The theory was eventually abandoned by scientists and physicians after 1880, replaced by the germ theory of disease: specific germs, not miasma, caused specific diseases. However, cultural beliefs about getting rid of odor made the clean-up of waste a high priority for cities.

Etymology
The word miasma comes from ancient Greek and means 'pollution'.
The idea also gave rise to the name malaria (literally 'bad air') through medieval Italian.

Views worldwide

Miasma was considered to be a poisonous vapor or mist filled with particles from decomposed matter (miasmata) that caused illnesses. The miasmatic position was that diseases were the product of environmental factors such as contaminated water, foul air, and poor hygienic conditions. Such infection was not passed between individuals but would affect individuals within the locale that gave rise to such vapors. It was identifiable by its foul smell. It was also initially believed that miasmas were propagated through worms from ulcers within those affected by a plague.

Europe

In the fifth or fourth century BC, Hippocrates wrote about the effects of the environs over the human diseases:

In the 1st century BC, the Roman architectural writer Vitruvius described the potential effects of miasma (Latin nebula) from fetid swamplands when visiting a city:

The miasmatic theory of disease remained popular in the Middle Ages and a sense of effluvia contributed to Robert Boyle's Suspicions about the Hidden Realities of the Air.

In the 1850s, miasma was used to explain the spread of cholera in London and in Paris, partly justifying Haussmann's later renovation of the French capital. The disease was said to be preventable by cleansing and scouring of the body and items. Dr. William Farr, the assistant commissioner for the 1851 London census, was an important supporter of the miasma theory. He believed that cholera was transmitted by air, and that there was a deadly concentration of miasmata near the River Thames' banks. Such a belief was in part accepted because of the general lack of air quality in urbanized areas. The wide acceptance of miasma theory during the cholera outbreaks overshadowed the partially correct theory brought forth by John Snow that cholera was spread through water. This slowed the response to the major outbreaks in the Soho district of London and other areas. The Crimean War nurse Florence Nightingale (1820–1910) was a proponent of the theory and worked to make hospitals sanitary and fresh-smelling. It was stated in 'Notes on Nursing for the Labouring Classes' (1860) that Nightingale would "keep the air [the patient] breathes as pure as the external air."

Fear of miasma registered in many early nineteenth-century warnings concerning what was termed "unhealthy fog". The presence of fog was thought to strongly indicate the presence of miasma. The miasmas were thought to behave like smoke or mist, blown with air currents, wafted by winds. It was thought that miasma didn't simply travel on air but changed the air through which it propagated; the atmosphere was infected by miasma, as diseased people were.

China
In China, miasma (alternative names) is an old concept of illness, used extensively by ancient Chinese local chronicles and works of literature. Miasma has different names in Chinese culture. Most of the explanations of miasma refer to it as a kind of sickness, or poison gas.

The ancient Chinese thought that miasma was related to the environment of parts of Southern China. The miasma was thought to be caused by the heat, moisture and the dead air in the Southern Chinese mountains. They thought that insects' waste polluted the air, the fog, and the water, and the virgin forest harbored a great environment for miasma to occur.

In descriptions by ancient travelers, soldiers, or local officials (most of them are men of letters) of the phenomenon of miasma, fog, haze, dust, gas, or poison geological gassing were always mentioned. The miasma was thought to have caused a lot of diseases such as the cold, influenza, heat strokes, malaria, or dysentery. In the medical history of China, malaria had been referred to by different names in different dynasty periods. Poisoning and psittacosis were also called miasma in ancient China because they did not accurately understand the cause of disease.

In the Sui dynasty, doctor Chao Yuanfang mentioned miasma in his book On Pathogen and Syndromes (諸病源候論). He thought that miasma in Southern China was similar to typhoid fever in Northern China. However, in his opinion, miasma was different from malaria and dysentery. In his book, he discussed dysentery in another chapter, and malaria in a single chapter. He also claimed that miasma caused various diseases, so he suggested that one should find apt and specific ways to resolve problems.

The concept of miasma developed in several stages. First, before the Western Jin dynasty, the concept of miasma was gradually forming; at least, in the Eastern Han dynasty, there was no description of miasma. During the Eastern Jin, large numbers of northern people moved south, and miasma was then recognized by men of letters and nobility. After the Sui and the Tang dynasty, scholars-bureaucrats sent to be the local officials recorded and investigated miasma. As a result, the government became concerned about the severe cases and the causes of miasma by sending doctors to the areas of epidemic to research the disease and heal the patients. In the Ming dynasty and Qing dynasty, versions of local chronicles record different miasma in different places.

However, Southern China was highly developed in the Ming and Qing dynasties. The environment changed rapidly, and after the 19th century, western science and medical knowledge were introduced into China, and people knew how to distinguish and deal with the disease. The concept of miasma therefore faded out due to the progress of medicine in China.

Influence in Southern China
The terrifying miasma diseases in the southern regions of China made it the primary location for relegating officials and sending criminals to exile since the Qin-Han Dynasty. Poet Han Yu of the Tang dynasty, for example, wrote to his nephew who came to see him off after his banishment to the Chao Prefecture in his poem, En Route (左遷至藍關示姪孫湘):

The prevalent belief and predominant fear of the southern region with its "poisonous air and gases" is evident in historical documents.

Similar topics and feelings toward the miasma-infected south are often reflected in early Chinese poetry and records. Most scholars of the time agreed that the geological environments in the south had a direct impact on the population composition and growth. Many historical records reflect that females were less prone to miasma infection, and mortality rates were much higher in the south, especially for the men. This directly influenced agriculture cultivation and the southern economy, as men were the engine of agriculture production. Zhou Qufei, a local magistrate from the Southern Song Dynasty described in his treatise, Representative Answers from the South: "... The men are short and tan, while the women were plump and seldom came down with illness," and exclaimed at the populous female population in the Guangxi region.

This inherent environmental threat also prevented immigration from other regions. Hence, development in the damp and sultry south was much slower than in the north, where the dynasties' political power resided for much of early Chinese history.

India
In India, there was also a miasma theory . Gambir was considered the first antimiasmatic application. This gambir tree is found in Southern India and Sri Lanka.

Developments from 19th century onwards

Zymotic theory
Based on zymotic theory, people believed vapors called miasmata (singular: miasma) rose from the soil and spread diseases. Miasmata were believed to come from rotting vegetation and foul water—especially in swamps and urban ghettos.

Many people, especially the weak or infirm, avoided breathing night air by going indoors and keeping windows and doors shut. In addition to ideas associated with zymotic theory, there was also a general fear that cold or cool air spread disease. The fear of night air gradually disappeared as understanding about disease increased as well as with improvements in home heating and ventilation. Particularly important was the understanding that the agent spreading malaria was the mosquito (active at night) rather than miasmata.

Contagionism versus miasmatism
Prior to the late 19th century, night air was considered dangerous in most Western cultures. Throughout the 19th century, the medical community was divided on the explanation for disease proliferation. On one side were the contagionists, believing disease was passed through physical contact, while others believed disease was present in the air in the form of miasma, and thus could proliferate without physical contact. Two members of the latter group were Dr. Thomas S. Smith and Florence Nightingale.

Thomas Southwood Smith spent many years comparing the miasmatic theory to contagionism.

Florence Nightingale:

The current germ theory accounts for disease proliferation by both direct and indirect physical contact.

Influence on sanitary engineering reforms

In the early 19th century, the living conditions in industrialized cities in Britain were increasingly unsanitary. The population was growing at a much faster rate than the infrastructure could support. For example, the population of Manchester doubled within a single decade, leading to overcrowding and a significant increase in waste accumulation. The miasma theory of disease made sense to the sanitary reformers of the mid-19th century. Miasmas explained why cholera and other diseases were epidemic in places where the water was stagnant and foul-smelling. A leading sanitary reformer, London's Edwin Chadwick, asserted that "all smell is disease", and maintained that a fundamental change in the structure of sanitation systems was needed to combat increasing urban mortality rates.

Chadwick saw the problem of cholera and typhoid epidemics as being directly related to urbanization, and he proposed that new, independent sewerage systems should be connected to homes. Chadwick supported his proposal with reports from the London Statistical Society which showed dramatic increases in both morbidity and mortality rates since the beginning of urbanization in the early 19th century. Though Chadwick proposed reform on the basis of the miasma theory, his proposals did contribute to improvements in sanitation, such as preventing the reflux of noxious air from sewers back into houses by using separate drainage systems in the design of sanitation. That led, incidentally, to decreased outbreaks of cholera and thus helped to support the theory.

The miasma theory was consistent with the observation that disease was associated with poor sanitation, and hence foul odours, and that sanitary improvements reduced disease. However, it was inconsistent with the findings arising from microbiology and bacteriology in the later 19th century, which eventually led to the adoption of the germ theory of disease, although consensus was not reached immediately. Concerns over sewer gas, which was a major component of the miasma theory developed by Galen, and brought to prominence by the "Great Stink" in London in the summer of 1858, led proponents of the theory to observe that sewers enclosed the refuse of the human bowel, which medical science had discovered could teem with typhoid, cholera, and other microbes.

In 1846, the Nuisances Removal and Diseases Prevention Act was passed to identify whether the transmission of cholera was by air or by water. The act was used to encourage owners to clean their dwellings and connect them to sewers.

Even though eventually disproved by the understanding of bacteria and the discovery of viruses, the miasma theory helped establish the connection between poor sanitation and disease. That encouraged cleanliness and spurred public health reforms which, in Britain, led to the Public Health Acts of 1848 and 1858, and the Local Government Act of 1858. The latter of those enabled the instituting of investigations into the health and sanitary regulations of any town or place, upon the petition of residents or as a result of death rates exceeding the norm. Early medical and sanitary engineering reformers included Henry Austin, Joseph Bazalgette, Edwin Chadwick, Frank Forster, Thomas Hawksley, William Haywood, Henry Letheby, Robert Rawlinson, John Simon, John Snow and Thomas Wicksteed. Their efforts, and associated British regulatory improvements, were reported in the United States as early as 1865.

Particularly notable in 19th century sanitation reform is the work of Joseph Bazalgette, chief engineer to London's Metropolitan Board of Works. Encouraged by the Great Stink, Parliament sanctioned Bazalgette to design and construct a comprehensive system of sewers, which intercepted London's sewage and diverted it away from its water supply. The system helped purify London's water and saved the city from epidemics. In 1866, the last of the three great British cholera
epidemics took hold in a small area of Whitechapel. However, the area was not yet connected to Bazalgette's system, and the confined area of the epidemic acted as testament to the efficiency of the system's design.

Years later, the influence of those sanitary reforms on Britain was described by Richard Rogers:

The miasma theory did contribute to containing disease in urban settlements, but did not allow the adoption of a suitable approach to the reuse of excreta in agriculture. It was a major factor in the practice of collecting human excreta from urban settlements and reusing them in the surrounding farmland. That type of resource recovery scheme was common in major cities in the 19th century before the introduction of sewer-based sanitation systems. Nowadays, the reuse of excreta, when done in a hygienic manner, is known as ecological sanitation, and is promoted as a way of "closing the loop".

Throughout the 19th century, concern about public health and sanitation, along with the influence of the miasma theory, were reasons for the advocacy of the then-controversial practice of cremation. If infectious diseases were spread by noxious gases emitted from decaying organic matter, that included decaying corpses. The public health argument for cremation faded with the eclipsing of the miasma theory of disease.

Replacement by germ theory
Although the connection between germ and disease was proposed quite early, it was not until the late 1800s that the germ theory was generally accepted. The miasmatic theory was challenged by John Snow, suggesting that there was some means by which the disease was spread via a poison or morbid material in the water. He suggested this before and in response to a cholera epidemic on Broad Street in central London in 1854. Because of the miasmatic theory's predominance among Italian scientists, the discovery in the same year by Filippo Pacini of the bacillus that caused the disease was completely ignored. It was not until 1876 that Robert Koch proved that the bacterium Bacillus anthracis caused anthrax, which brought a definitive end to miasma theory.

1854 Broad Street cholera outbreak 

The work of John Snow is notable for helping to make the connection between cholera and typhoid epidemics and contaminated water sources, which contributed to the eventual demise of miasma theory. During the cholera epidemic of 1854, Snow traced high mortality rates among the citizens of Soho to a water pump in Broad Street. Snow convinced the local government to remove the pump handle, which resulted in a marked decrease in cases of cholera in the area. In 1857, Snow submitted a paper to the British Medical Journal which attributed high numbers of cholera cases to water sources that were contaminated with human waste. Snow used statistical data to show that citizens who received their water from upstream sources were considerably less likely to develop cholera than those who received their water from downstream sources. Though his research supported his hypothesis that contaminated water, not foul air, was the source of cholera
epidemics, a review committee concluded that Snow's findings were not significant enough to warrant change, and they were summarily dismissed. Additionally, other interests intervened in the process of reform. Many water companies and civic authorities pumped water directly from contaminated sources such as the Thames to public wells, and the idea of changing sources or implementing filtration techniques was an unattractive economic prospect. In the face of such economic interests, reform was slow to be adopted.

In 1855, John Snow made a testimony against the Amendment to the "Nuisances Removal and Diseases Prevention Act" that regularized air pollution of some industries. He claimed that:

In the same year, William Farr, who was then the major supporter of the miasma theory, issued a report to criticize the germ theory. Farr and the Committee wrote that:

Experiments by Louis Pasteur 
The more formal experiments on the relationship between germ and disease were conducted by Louis Pasteur between 1860 and 1864. He discovered the pathology of the puerperal fever and the pyogenic vibrio in the blood, and suggested using boric acid to kill these microorganisms before and after confinement.

By 1866, eight years after the death of John Snow, William Farr publicly acknowledged that the miasma theory on the transmission of cholera was wrong, by his statistical justification on the death rate.

Anthrax
Robert Koch is widely known for his work with anthrax, discovering the causative agent of the fatal disease to be Bacillus anthracis. His publication in 1877 on the structure of anthrax bacterium marked the first photography of a bacterium. He discovered the formation of spores in anthrax bacteria, which could remain dormant under specific conditions. However, under optimal conditions, the spores were activated and caused disease. To determine this causative agent, he dry-fixed bacterial cultures onto glass slides, used dyes to stain the cultures, and observed them through a microscope. His work with anthrax is notable in that he was the first to link a specific microorganism with a specific disease, rejecting the idea of spontaneous generation and supporting the germ theory of disease.

In popular culture
In Inuyasha, Naraku has the power of the miasma.
In Inuyasha the Movie: Swords of an Honorable Ruler, as Sō'unga killed it the ogres, and according to Saya their corpses contained the miasma.
In Episode 44 of Yashahime: Princess Half-Demon, the Grim Comet has the miasma.
The video game Dwarf Fortress features miasma as a literal fog that emerges from rotten items and corpses. It reduces the happiness of the dwarves, though it doesn't necessarily cause them to fall ill.
In Over the Garden Wall one of the characters is defeated by opening a window and letting the night air in.

See also
 Germ theory of disease
 Airborne disease
 Homeopathy

References

Further reading

External links
 Prevailing theories before the germ theory
 Cholera theories
 Term definition

Obsolete medical theories
Superstitions
Night